Lorna Doone is a British romance/drama television mini-series version of Richard Doddridge Blackmore's 1869 novel of the same name that aired on BBC One from 24 to 26 December 2000 in the UK and on A&E on 11 March 2001 in the U.S. The film won the Royal Television Society's Television Award for Best Visual Effects by Colin Gorry.

Cast
Lorna Doone - Amelia Warner
John Ridd - Richard Coyle
Carver Doone - Aidan Gillen
Jeremy Stickles - Martin Clunes
Sir Ensor Doone - Peter Vaughan
Sarah Ridd - 	Barbara Flynn
Baron de Whichehalse - Martin Jarvis
Judge Jeffreys	- Michael Kitchen
Counsellor Doone - Anton Lesser
Uncle Reuben - Jack Shepherd
Tom Faggus - Anthony Calf
Marwood de Whichehalse - Jesse Spencer
Lizzie Ridd - Joanne Froggatt
Annie Ridd - Honeysuckle Weeks
Ruth Huckaback - Rebecca Callard
Betty Muxworthy - Ruth Sheen
Gwenny Fairfax - Helen Coker
John Fry - 	Trevor Cooper
Sergeant Bloxham - 	James McAvoy
Young John Ridd - 	 Jack Baverstock
Young Lorna Doone - 	 Katie Pitts Drake
Charley Doone - 	Oliver Chris
Jack Ridd - 	 Neil Finnigan
Parson Bowden - 	Trevor Peacock
Colonel Kirke - 	Pip Torrens
James II & VII- Robert Addie

References

External links 
 
Lorna Doone (2001) at movies.nytimes.com

2000 British television series debuts
2000 British television series endings
2000s British drama television series
BBC television dramas
2000s British television miniseries
Television shows based on British novels
English-language television shows
Films based on Lorna Doone
British romantic drama films
Television shows set in the United Kingdom
2000 romantic drama films
2000s English-language films